This is the complete list of Asian Games medalists in boxing from 1954 to 2018.

Men

Light flyweight
 48 kg: 1966–2006
 49 kg: 2010–2018

Flyweight
 51 kg: 1954–2006
 52 kg: 2010–2018
 51 kg: 2022–

Bantamweight
 54 kg: 1954–2006
 56 kg: 2010–2018

Featherweight
 57 kg: 1954–

Lightweight
 60 kg: 1954–2018

Light welterweight
 63.5 kg: 1954–2002
 64 kg: 2006–2018
 63.5 kg: 2022–

Welterweight
 67 kg: 1954–2002
 69 kg: 2006–2018

Light middleweight
 71 kg: 1954–

Middleweight
 75 kg: 1958–2018

Light heavyweight
 81 kg: 1958–2014
 80 kg: 2022–

Heavyweight
 +81 kg: 1958–1978
 91 kg: 1982–2014
 92 kg: 2022–

Super heavyweight
 +91 kg: 1982–2014
 +92 kg: 2022–

Women

Light flyweight
 50 kg: 2022–

Flyweight
 51 kg: 2010–2018

Bantamweight
 54 kg: 2022–

Featherweight
 57 kg: 2018–

Lightweight
 60 kg: 2010–

Welterweight
 66 kg: 2022–

Middleweight
 75 kg: 2010–

References

External links
List of medalists

Boxing
medalists
Asian Games medalists